Metallurg Novokuznetsk is a professional ice hockey team from Siberia based in Novokuznetsk, Kemerovo Oblast, Russia. They are currently members of the Supreme Hockey League (VHL).

History
The team was founded in 1949 in Novokuznetsk (then Stalinsk) to compete in the lower divisions of the Soviet ice hockey championship. During the 1960s, Metallurg managed to advance to the elite group for several seasons, but did not establish itself as a major club until the 1990s when the International Hockey League was formed.

During the first years of the post-Soviet era, Novokuznetsk significantly improved its roster with players from the Ust-Kamenogorsk school. 

The team's downfall began in 2004 when its managerial staff moved to SKA Saint Petersburg signing the best players from Novokuznetsk. Despite that the team was able to rebuild itself and years later joined the Kontinental Hockey League in 2008.

Following the 2016–17 season, with the KHL in need to regulate debts amongst clubs through contraction and with Novokuznetsk in financial trouble pertaining to a lack of success on the ice, they were excluded from participating in the KHL on May 24, 2017. Novokuznetsk will continue to operate their junior club program and also participate in the secondary tier of the VHL.

On 21 May 2020, Metallurg ended their affiliation with HC Sibir Novosibirsk, opting to be the farm team for Avangard Omsk of the KHL for the 2020–21 season.

Honors

Winners

 President of the Republic of Kazakhstan's Cup (1): 2016

Runners-up
 Russian Superleague Championship (1): 2000

Season-by-season KHL record
Note: GP = Games played, W = Wins, L = Losses, T = Ties, OTL = Overtime/shootout losses, Pts = Points, GF = Goals for, GA = Goals against

Franchise records and leaders

KHL scoring leaders

These were the top-ten KHL point-scorers in franchise history.

''Note: Pos = Position; GP = Games played; G = Goals; A = Assists; Pts = Points; P/G = Points per game

References

External links
 Metallurg Novokuznetsk official website

 
Ice hockey teams in Russia
Former Kontinental Hockey League teams
Sport in Novokuznetsk